The Great Moss Swamp (also known as the Loganburn Reservoir) is located in Otago, New Zealand. It lies in the Maniototo, close to the former gold mining route of the Old Dunstan Road, 85 kilometres to the northwest of Dunedin city centre. It is classified as a regionally significant wetland.

The swamp lies on the upper surface of the Rock and Pillar Range (the Rock and Pillars are a horst range, and thus have a very flat top). Originally an actual swamp, a dam to store water for irrigation and hydroelectricity has turned the 'swamp' into a lake. The swamp is drained by the Logan Burn, which feeds into the Taieri River at Paerau. There are still significant areas of swampy wetland at the southwestern end of the lake.

The Loganburn Reservoir was finished in 1983, holding about 85 million cu m of water. 
In 2014 the dam was raised by 80 cm, through the addition of an 80 cm-high spillway, and increasing the height of the coping wall along the top of the dam.
This increased the storage by some 11.5 million cu m.
The dam is located on the southern end of the Rock and Pillar Range, about 12 km south of Paerau, providing irrigation for 60 farmers and 9,300ha, and power generation when water is released for irrigation.

References

Wetlands of Otago
Lakes of Otago
Reservoirs in New Zealand